Monica Rose McLemore (born 1969) is an American nurse who is an Associate Professor of Family Health Nursing at the University of California, San Francisco. Her work considers reproductive justice and medical care for marginalised communities, with an overarching aim to eliminate healthcare inequalities. During the COVID-19 pandemic, McLemore studied the impact of coronavirus disease during pregnancy.

Early life and education 
McLemore was born as a preemie (pre-term birth). She had no medical members of her family, but decided to become a nurse when she was eight years old. She studied nursing at The College of New Jersey. She earned a Master of Public Health at San Francisco State University. McLemore moved to the University of California, San Francisco for her graduate studies, where she studied CA-125; an antigen that is associated with tumours.

Research and career 
McLemore studies the relationship between physical and mental health in low-income communities of colour. Her research makes use of reproductive justice theory; which argues that people who become pregnant have the right to decide how they want the birth to be. Rooted in reproductive justice theory, McLemore launched the Saving Our Ladies from early births And Reducing Stress (SOLARS) study, which looks to understand the impact of stress, anxiety and racism on gestational duration in Black and Latina communities.

McLemore was part of the preterm birth initiative (PTBi-California), which looks to understand why preterm births mainly occur in low-income women of colour. PTBi-California looks to mitigate for the disproportionate impact that preterm births have on already marginalised communities; and to work with physicians and educators to deserve programmes that better support these communities.

In 2020 McLemore retired from her clinical nursing career to focus entirely on research with a focus on Black maternal health. During the COVID-19 pandemic, McLemore studied the impact of coronavirus disease during pregnancy, and why Black Americans were hardest hit by the disease. In an article for Scientific American, she argued that the coronavirus disease was not an excuse to abandon pregnant women.

Awards and honours 
 2015 American College of Nurse Midwives Teaching Award
 2015 Speaking Race to Power Fellow
 2018 Abortion Care Network Person of the Year
 2019 Fellow of the American Academy of Nursing
 2019 Excellence in Leadership Association of Women's Health, Obstetric and Neonatal Nurses
 2020 UCSF Campaign Alumni Award

Selected publications 

McLemore has written for Vice, San Francisco Chronicle and Scientific American.

References 

1969 births
Living people
African-American women academics
American women academics
African-American academics
African-American women physicians
African-American physicians
African-American nurses
UCSF School of Medicine faculty
The College of New Jersey alumni
San Francisco State University alumni
21st-century African-American people
20th-century African-American people
20th-century African-American women
21st-century African-American women